University art museums and galleries are collections of art that are developed, owned, and maintained by schools, colleges, and universities. There are approximately 680 university art museums and galleries in the United States. While historically the origins of these kinds of institutions can be traced back to learning collections in art academies in Western Europe, they are now most often housed in centers of higher education. The primary aim of many university art museums and galleries is to create a sphere removed from the pressures of the commercial art world where students, artists, curators, and faculty can experiment freely; in terms of both making and exhibiting art, and also curating.

Distinctions between art museums, galleries, and academic museums
An art museum houses a permanent collection, whereas a gallery usually hosts a changing program of art exhibitions. However, some university and college art galleries also feature permanent collections or showcase collections owned by the larger institution. Some institutions have a museum or an art gallery, and some have both. Others, such as the City College of New York, have important collections but neither a museum nor a dedicated gallery.

Art schools in the United States often have many gallery spaces on campus. Maryland Institute College of Art has 21 galleries.

Many university and college libraries also feature galleries to showcase items from their collections, which can include art, music, poetry, literary works and ephemera.

Another important distinction is the difference between art museums and academic museums. All university art museums and galleries are types of academic museums, but not all academic museums are university art museums and galleries.

Vulnerability in times of crisis
University art museums function in a number of different ways. Some exist as affiliates of a university, operated by a separate board of trustees and administration, while others are nested within the institution. Art museum collections can become vulnerable to deaccession due to fiscal issues. One such example of a controversial deaccession was the Randolph College scandal; when the administration sold paintings from the museum's collection without the permission of the museum.

Academic freedoms and artistic freedoms of expression
University art museums and galleries differ from traditional art museums and commercial galleries due to their relationship with institutions of higher education where academic freedoms are ideally upheld. With the protection of academic freedoms, topics that would otherwise be avoided, ignored, or censored can be openly explored. The two main academic freedoms are: the freedom of the student to study whatever they want, and the freedom of the teacher to teach whatever they want. When these two freedoms are observed, in the context of a university art museum and/or gallery, a unique setting for academic discovery is opened up. University art museums and exhibits are sometimes sources of controversies regarding issues of propriety, politics, gender, and sexuality.

See also
 American Alliance of Museums
Effects of the Great Recession on museums
 Museum Accreditation in America
List of university art museums and galleries in New York State
List of university museums in the United States

References

External links
 Association of Academic Museums and Galleries
 College Art Association

Art museums
Art museums and galleries in the United States